The L. Bliss House is a historic house located at 90 West Main Street in Westfield, Chautauqua County, New York.

Description and history 
It is a two-story, wood-framed Italian Villa style dwelling built in 1853. It is believed to have been built for Lorenzo Bliss, a local brewer.

It was listed on the National Register of Historic Places on September 26, 1983.

References

Houses on the National Register of Historic Places in New York (state)
Houses completed in 1853
Houses in Chautauqua County, New York
U.S. Route 20
National Register of Historic Places in Chautauqua County, New York